Hans Weidemann (1904-1975) was a German artist, photographer and film director.

Weidemann joined the Nazi party in 1927.

Weidemann directed Festliches Nürnberg (English: Festive Nuremberg), a short 1937 propaganda film chronicling the Nazi Party rallies in Nuremberg in 1936 and 1937.

Weidemann co-wrote and produced Attack on Baku (German: Anschlag auf Baku), a 1942 German thriller film directed by Fritz Kirchhoff.

References

External links

1904 births
1975 deaths
German documentary film directors
20th-century German photographers
Film people from Essen
Film directors from North Rhine-Westphalia